Bremen is an unincorporated community in Marshall County, Kansas, United States.  As of the 2020 census, the population of the community and nearby areas was 51.

History
Bremen was laid out in 1886 by Henry Brenneke, a native of Bremen, Germany.

Demographics

For statistical purposes, the United States Census Bureau has defined this community as a census-designated place (CDP).

Economy
Bremen Farmers Mutual Insurance Company is the main employer in Bremen.  Also, the community has a U.S. Post Office.

Education
The community is served by Marysville USD 364 public school district.

References

Further reading

External links
 Marshall County maps: Current, Historic, KDOT

Unincorporated communities in Marshall County, Kansas
Unincorporated communities in Kansas